Dos Palmas Spring is an artesian spring in Riverside County, California where it lies at the foot of the Orocopia Mountains.  It is only one of several such springs in the area that create an oasis in the Colorado Desert there.

History
Dos Palmas Spring, an artesian spring was a watering place in the Salton Sink for Native Americans traveling across the Colorado Desert between the Colorado River and Southern California for centuries.  For many years the oasis was a camp and watering spot on a long used trail along the oasis's at the foot of the mountains east of the Salton Sink to the Yuma Crossing and Yuma, Arizona to the southeast.

From 1862, it became a camp and watering stop for gold seekers and other travelers along the Bradshaw Trail between San Bernardino and the gold mining boomtown of La Paz, Arizona and later to nearby Ehrenberg that replaced it.  A stage stop called Dos Palmas was established there for the Bradshaw and Yuma roads.   This spring and stage station was the site of the murder of Herman Ehrenberg on October 9, 1866.

For a short time in May - June, 1877, there was a post office at that location.

Dos Palmas Preserve
The Dos Palmas Spring is now part of the Dos Palmas Preserve a 14,000-acre preserve created to protect important biological resources.  The oasis with its hundreds of desert fan palms and pools fed by artesian springs and seepage from the nearby Coachella Canal form a wetland that offers shelter from the hot, dry Colorado Desert to a variety of both threatened or endangered and more common animal species.  These include the endangered Yuma Rail, the Desert Pupfish and the Orocopia Sage.

References

 Gary L. Shumway, Larry Vredenburgh, Russell Hartill, Desert Fever: An Overview of Mining History of the California Desert Conservation Area; February, 1980, complete pdf version
  Gary L. Shumway, Larry Vredenburgh, Russell Hartill, Desert Fever: An Overview of Mining History of the California Desert Conservation Area; Riverside County, February, 1980
  Desert Fever: An Overview of Mining History of the California Desert Conservation Area; Riverside County, End Notes
  Randall Henderson, Waterhole on the Old Bradshaw Trail, Desert Magazine, January 1947 
 

Bodies of water of Riverside County, California
Geography of the Colorado Desert
Springs of California
Former settlements in Riverside County, California
Former populated places in California
American frontier
Stagecoach stops in the United States
Bradshaw Trail
1862 establishments in California